Harmesh Malhotra (14 June 1936 – 22 November 2005) was an Indian film director, producer, and screenplay writer.

Family

His daughter Payal Malhotra acted in films.

Filmography

As director
Beti (1969)
Gaddaar (1973) Producer also
Patthar Aur Payal (1974)
Lafange (1975) Producer also
Sangram (1976)
Phaansi (1978) Producer also
Amar Shakti (1978)
Bagula Bhagat (1979)
Choron Ki Baaraat (1980)
Poonam (1981)
Raaz (1981)
Aapas Ki Baat (1981)
Mangal Pandey (1983) Producer also
Phaansi Ke Baad (1985) Producer also
Nagina (1986) Producer also
Khazana (1987)
Sherni (1988)
Dharam Shatru (1988)
Nigahen (1989) Producer also
Vidrohi (1990)
Amiri Garibi (1990)
Banjaran (1991)
Heer Ranjha (1992) Producer also
Cheetah (1994)
Paappi Devataa (1994)
Kismat (1995)
Tu Haseen Main Jawaan (1997)
Dulhe Raja (1998) Producer also
Akhiyon Se Goli Maare (2002) Producer also
Khullam Khulla Pyaar Karen (2005)

As Writer (Screenplay)

Nigahen (1989)

References

External links
 

1936 births
2005 deaths
Hindi-language film directors
20th-century Indian film directors
21st-century Indian film directors
Hindi screenwriters
20th-century Indian screenwriters